Passaic County is a county in the U.S. state of New Jersey that is part of the New York metropolitan area. As of the 2020 United States census, the population of Passaic County was enumerated at 524,118, its highest decennial count ever and an increase of 22,892 (4.6%) from the 501,226 counted at the 2010 U.S. census, in turn an increase of 12,177 (+2.5%) from the 489,049 counted in the 2000 census. The most populous place in Passaic County is Paterson, with 159,732 residents at the 2020 Census, more than 29% of the county's population, while West Milford covered , the largest total area of any municipality and more than 40% of the county's area.

Passaic County was created on February 7, 1837, from portions of Bergen and Essex counties. The county derives its name from "Pasaeck", which is a native Lenape word meaning "valley." The county is part of the North Jersey region.

Geography and climate
The county has a humid continental climate which is hot-summer (Dfa) except in higher areas to the north where it is warm-summer (Dfb).

The landscape of Passaic County, near the north edge of New Jersey, spans some hilly areas and has dozens of lakes. The region is split by major roads, including portions of Interstate 287 and Interstate 80, near Paterson. The Garden State Parkway cuts across the southern end, near Clifton. The Passaic River winds northeast past Totowa into Paterson, where the river then turns south to Passaic, on the way to Newark, further south.

The lowest elevation is approximately  along the Passaic River in Clifton. The southeastern, more populous half of the county is either flat near the river or mildly hilly. The northwestern section is rugged and mountainous.

Demographics

2020 Census
As of the Census of 2020, the county's had 524,118 people, 168,059 households, and 120,593 families. The county's racial makeup was 38.8% White, 9.9% African American, 0.13% Native American, 5.76% Asian, and 1.95% from two or more races. Hispanic or Latino of any race were 42.74% of the population.

Of the 168,059 households, of which 30.4% had children under the age of 18 living with them, 48.6% were married couples living together, 30.0% had a female householder with no husband present, 15.2% had a male householder with no wife present and 28.2% were non-families. 47.5% of all households were made up of individuals, and 11.4% had someone living alone who was 65 years of age or older. The average household size was 2.93 and the average family size was 3.49.

About 23.7% of the county's population was under age 18, 9.6% was from age 18 to 24, 39.6% was from age 15 to 44, and 15.0% was age 65 or older. The median age was 37.7 years. The gender makeup of the city was 48.8% male and 51.2% female. For every 100 females, there were 95.3 males.

The county's median household income was $77,040, and the median family income was $81,873. About 13.4% of the population were below the poverty line, including 24.7% of those under age 18 and 11.6% of those age 65 or over.

2010 Census

Same-sex couples headed one in 149 households in 2010.

2000 Census
As of the 2000 United States census there were 489,049 people, 163,856 households, and 119,614 families residing in the county. The racial makeup of the county was 62.32% White, 13.22% Black or African American, 0.44% Native American, 3.69% Asian, 0.04% Pacific Islander, 16.24% from other races, and 4.05% from two or more races. 29.95% of the population were Hispanic or Latino of any race. Among those who reported their ancestry, 16.6% were of Italian, 9.5% Irish, 8.1% German and 6.2% Polish ancestry according to Census 2000.

There were 163,856 households, out of which 35.60% had children under the age of 18 living with them, 51.50% were married couples living together, 16.00% had a female householder with no husband present, and 27.00% were non-families. 22.20% of all households were made up of individuals, and 9.50% had someone living alone who was 65 years of age or older. The average household size was 2.92 and the average family size was 3.42.

In the county, the population was spread out, with 26.10% under the age of 18, 9.30% from 18 to 24, 31.30% from 25 to 44, 21.30% from 45 to 64, and 12.10% who were 65 years of age or older. The median age was 35 years. For every 100 females, there were 94.00 males. For every 100 females age 18 and over, there were 90.80 males.

The median income for a household in the county was $49,210, and the median income for a family was $56,054. Males had a median income of $38,740 versus $29,954 for females. The per capita income for the county was $21,370. About 9.40% of families and 12.30% of the population were below the poverty line, including 17.30% of those under age 18 and 9.20% of those age 65 or over.

Government

County government

The Passaic County Court House and Administrative Building complex is located at the county seat in Paterson. In Passaic County's commission form of government, the Board of County Commissioners discharges both executive and legislative responsibilities. Seven Commissioners are elected at-large for three-year terms on a staggered basis. A Director and Deputy Director are elected from among the seven Commissioners, at an annual reorganization meeting in January. Passaic County operates through six standing committees of the Board of County Commissioners. They are: Administration & Finance; Health, Education and Community Affairs; Public Works and Buildings & Grounds; Law & Public Safety; Human Services and Planning and Economic Development. The Commissioners also appoint individuals to departments, agencies, boards, and commissions for the effective administration of the county government. In 2016, commissioners were paid $28,500, and the director was paid an annual salary of $29,500. The Commissioners select a County Administrator, who, in the role of chief administrative officer, supervises the day-to-day operation of the county government and its departments; Anthony J. DeNova III, the County Administrator until 2022, resigned at the end of that calendar year in order to pursue personal interests, and was replaced by county counsel Matthew Jordan.

, Passaic County's Commissioners are (with terms for Chair and Vice-Chair ending every December 31st): 

 

Constitutional officers, elected on a countywide basis, are:

 

The Passaic County Prosecutor is Camelia M. Valdes of Bloomingdale, who was appointed by Governor of New Jersey Jon S. Corzine in May 2009 and renominated by Governor Chris Christie in June 2015. Passaic County constitutes Vicinage 11 of the New Jersey Superior Court and is seated at the Passaic County Courthouse in Paterson; the Assignment Judge for Vicinage 11 is Ernest M. Caposela. Law enforcement at the county level is provided by the Passaic County Sheriff and the Passaic County Prosecutor's Office.

Federal representatives 
Three Congressional Districts cover the county, with most of the northern portion of the county in the 5th District, most of the southern portion of the county in the 9th District, and the central portion of the county in the 11th District.

State representatives 
The 16 municipalities of Passaic County are represented by seven separate legislative districts

Policing
The Passaic County sheriff's department provides law enforcement functions throughout the entirety of Passaic County plus unincorporated county area police patrol, detective, crime scene investigation, SWAT, K-9 function, operation of the Passaic County Jail, and the security of all county-owned facilities, including the Passaic County Courthouse/Administration Complex. The incorporated cities within the county: Paterson, Passaic City, Clifton, Bloomingdale, Pompton Lakes, and Prospect Park have separate municipal police departments.

Transportation

Public transportation
Passaic County has a number NJ Transit stations, including Montclair State university, Little Falls, Wayne/RT 23 and Mountain View on the Montclair-Boonton Line. The “Main Line” corridor also runs through the county and includes the following stations: Hawthorne, Paterson, Clifton, Passaic and Delawanna.

Roads and highways
Passaic County has numerous important roads that travel within its borders:

Major county roads that pass through include: CR 502 (only in Wayne), CR 504, CR 509 CR 511 and CR 513.

Route 19 runs entirely through the county, connecting the Garden State Parkway with Interstate 80 and Paterson. Both Route 20 and Route 21 run along the eastern border alongside the Passaic River. Route 23 runs through the western section of the county, while both Route 3 and Route 161 go through Clifton. Route 62 also runs passes through entirely in Totowa. U.S. Route 202 runs roughly north-south only in Wayne Township while U.S. Route 46 traverses east-west.

Interstate 80 (Bergen-Passaic Expressway) runs east-west through the county, while Interstate 287 passes through the mountainous sections of Passaic. The Garden State Parkway also runs through the county solely in Clifton.

Politics
As of August 1, 2020, there were a total of 318,029 registered voters in Passaic County, of which 128,114 (40.3%) were registered as Democrats, 64,389 (20.3%) were registered as Republicans and 120,282 (37.8%) were registered as Unaffiliated. There were 5,244 (1.7%) voters registered to other parties. Among the county's 2010 Census population, 53.2% (vs. 53.2% in Passaic County) were registered to vote, including 70.8% of those ages 18 and over (vs. 70.8% countywide).

In the 2008 and 2012 presidential elections, Democrat Barack Obama received over 60% of the vote here in both elections. However, in the 2016 presidential election Democratic support declined to 59.5% and the 2020 presidential election saw Democratic support decline to 57.5% or a margin of 16.5% over Republican President Donald Trump, which is slightly wider than the state as a whole. 

|}

In the 2009 gubernatorial election, Democrat Jon Corzine received 50.8% of the vote here (57,010 ballots cast), ahead of Republican Chris Christie with 43.2% (48,500 votes), Independent Chris Daggett with 3.8% (4,288 votes) and other candidates with 0.9% (981 votes), among the 112,278 ballots cast by the county's 262,723 registered voters, yielding a 42.7% turnout. In the 2013 gubernatorial election, Republican Governor Chris Christie received 52.9% of the vote (53,858 votes) to Democrat Barbara Buono's 45.9% (46,825 votes), marking the only time in the 21st century the county voted Republican. In the 2017 gubernatorial election, Democrat Phil Murphy received 60.3% of the vote (57,415 votes) to Republican Kim Guadagno's 38.0% (36,230 votes). In the 2021 gubernatorial election, Democratic Governor Phil Murphy received 51.5% of the vote (57,812 votes) to Republican Jack Ciattarelli's	47.7% (53,551 votes).

Municipalities 
The 16 municipalities in Passaic County (with 2010 Census data for population, housing units and area in square miles) are: Other, unincorporated communities in the county are listed next to their parent municipality. Most of these areas are census-designated places (CDPs) that have been created by the United States Census Bureau for enumeration purposes within a Township. Other communities and enclaves that exist within a municipality are also listed next to the name.

Economy
Toys "R" Us' former US corporate headquarters was in Wayne.
Valley National Bank's corporate headquarters is in Wayne.
Linens ‘n Things's headquarters office was in Clifton and employed 17,500 before closing in 2009.
JVC has their US office in Wayne and employ approximately 19,040.

Education
Passaic County Community College, founded in 1971, serves students from Passaic County at campuses in Paterson, Wanaque and Wayne.
William Paterson University, established in 1855, is a public university located in Wayne.
Montclair State University, founded in 1908, is a public university located in Montclair, as well as portions of Little Falls and Clifton.
 Passaic County Technical Institute, founded in 1975, serves grades 9–12 with a higher level vocational schooling system.

Media
Passaic County is served by New York City-based commercial television & radio stations and New Jersey Network public television.
The West Milford Messenger, community newspaper in West Milford area
The Record, Suburban Trends and AIM West Milford, a weekly community newspaper

Points of interest
Dey Mansion, in Preakness, Wayne, served as Washington's Headquarters on several occasions during the American Revolutionary War.
Garret Mountain Reservation in Paterson and Woodland Park is a National Natural Landmark covering .
Paterson Great Falls National Historical Park in Paterson
High Mountain Park Preserve in Wayne
Lambert Castle in Paterson
Long Pond Ironworks State Park in West Milford
Paterson Museum, housed in the Rogers Locomotive and Machine Works in Paterson
Ringwood State Park in Ringwood
Skylands, the New Jersey State Botanical Garden in Ringwood, are formal gardens that are open to the public year-round. Originally constructed for Clarence MacKenzie Lewis in the 1920s, the entire property was acquired by the State of New Jersey in 1966 to form a State Botanical Garden covering  which include a Lilac Garden, Magnolia Walk, the Wild Flower Garden, the Crab Apple Vista, an allée of 166 trees extending almost a half-mile, and the Perennial Garden.
Yogi Berra Stadium in Little Falls - Located on the campus of Montclair State University, the stadium is home to the New Jersey Jackals of the independent Can-Am League as well as Montclair State's baseball team. The stadium has a capacity of 5,000 persons with permanent seating of 3,784 people and lawn seating which holds an additional 1,500.

See also

National Register of Historic Places listings in Passaic County, New Jersey

References

External links

Passaic County web site

 
1837 establishments in New Jersey
Counties in the New York metropolitan area
North Jersey
Populated places established in 1837